Michał Ambroży Kochanowski (1757–1832) was a Chamberlain of Stanisław August Poniatowski since 1778; deputy to the Great Sejm (1788–1792), councillor of Diplomatic Section of Provisional Temporary Council, member of the Supreme National Council during the Kościuszko Insurrection (1794), member of the government in the Duchy of Warsaw (1808–1815), senator, castellan and voivode in the Congress Poland since 1816, member of the Administrative Council during the November Uprising in 1831.

1757 births
1832 deaths
18th-century Polish nobility
Members of the Great Sejm
Kościuszko insurgents
Politicians of the Duchy of Warsaw
November Uprising participants
Senators of Congress Poland
Members of Polish government (November Uprising)
Recipients of the Order of the White Eagle (Poland)
Polish courtiers